Fidelity Union Life Insurance Company is an insurance company based in Dallas, Texas.  In 2012, it had assets in excess of $19 billion.  The high-rise residential building known as Mosaic Dallas originally served as its corporate offices.  It was founded in 1925 by Carr Collins, Sr. and William Morriss. It was acquired by Allianz in 1979.

References

Financial services companies established in 1925
Life insurance companies of the United States
Insurance companies based in Texas
Financial services companies of the United States
American companies established in 1925

1925 establishments in the United States
1925 establishments in Texas